Jalama may refer to:

Al Jalama, one of two places in Palestine;
the Jalama Formation, a Cretaceous rock unit in Southern California
Jalama Beach County Park, a beach park in Santa Barbara County, California
Jalama Wines, a California winery
Jálama, a Spanish mountain